Ben adam (Hebrew: בן־אדם  son of a man) in biblical Hebrew it simply means human being. For example, "son of man" in Job chapter 25 and Psalm 146 is ben adam, illustrating the Jewish concept of "son of man".

It is used in rabbinical and modern Hebrew to describe a righteous person, someone who does the right thing.

References

Hebrew words and phrases